

The THK-5 was a twin-engine aircraft designed by Stanisław Rogalski and built in Turkey in 1945 as an air ambulance. It was a conventional, low-wing cantilever monoplane of wooden construction throughout. The main units of the tailwheel undercarriage retracted into the wing-mounted engine nacelles and the THK-5 could carry two stretcher cases plus a medical attendant. This was followed in production by a six-seat utility transport version designated THK-5A and three examples of an improved version of the 5A designated THK-10. A single example of the type was exported, sold to Denmark.

When THK was taken over by MKEK, this was one of the designs selected for further work. However, although the designation MKEK-5 was allocated, nothing further came of this.

Variants
THK-5Air ambulance aircraft, carrying two stretcher cases plus a medical attendant.
THK-5A6-seat utility transport
THK-10 An improved version of the THK-5A; three built.
MKEK-5 The THK-5, THK-5A and THK-10 re-designated after THK was taken over by  Makina ve Kimya Endüstrisi Kurumu (MKEK), but no further development took place.

Specifications (THK-5A)

References

1940s Turkish civil utility aircraft
Low-wing aircraft
Turkish Aeronautical Association aircraft
Aircraft first flown in 1945
Twin piston-engined tractor aircraft